Jamieson Stadium is a stadium in Greensboro, North Carolina.  It was opened in 1949, and wooden bleachers were replaced with aluminum bleachers in 1989 in order to make sure it kept its status as one of the best high school football stadiums in the state. It is primarily used for American football and Soccer, and is the home field of Grimsley High School, Greensboro College and Gate City FC. The stadium holds 10,000 people.

References

College football venues
Sports venues in Greensboro, North Carolina
1949 establishments in North Carolina
Sports venues completed in 1949
American football venues in North Carolina
Soccer venues in North Carolina
High school football venues in the United States